Mary Smith may refer to:

Public officials
Mary Ellen Smith (1861/63–1933), Canadian legislator
Mary Louise Smith (politician) (1914–1997), American political organizer
Mary Ann Smith (born 1948), American local-level legislator
Mary L. Smith (born 1962), American official

Artists, entertainers, screen personalities
Diamond Teeth Mary (1902–2000), American blues singer, born Mary Smith
Mary Alice Smith (born 1941), African-American actress
Mary Lasswell Smith (1905–1994), American author
Mary Stoker Smith (born 1969), American television personality
Mary Stuart Smith (1834–1917), American author and translator
Mary Tillman Smith (1904–1995), American self-taught painter
Mary Winifrid Smith (1904–1992), British painter

Educators, academics, scientists
Mary Smith (psychologist) (1909–1989), Australian child psychologist
Mary Bell Smith (1818-1894), American educator, social reformer, and writer
Mary Bentinck Smith (1864–1921), English schoolmistress, headmistress of St Leonards School
Mary Carter Smith (1919–2007), African-American educator
Mary L. Smith (educator) (1936–2020), 11th president of Kentucky State University
Mary Lee Smith, American researcher and academic
Mary Perry Smith, American mathematics educator

Others
Mary Elizabeth Smith (1906–1991), aunt of John Lennon
Mary Fielding Smith (1801–1852), American member of Latter Day Saint movement
Mary Louise Smith (activist) (born 1937), African-American civil rights figure
Mary Margaret Smith (1893–2006), American supercentenarian 
Mary Russell Smith, daughter of Scottish-American painter William T. Russell Smith, who named the Mary Smith Prize for her
Mary Rozet Smith (1868–1934), American philanthropist
Mary Harris Smith (1844–1934), British accountant and entrepreneur

Characters
Mary Smith (EastEnders), from the BBC soap opera EastEnders
Mary Smith (Mary and the Witch's Flower)
Mary Smith (Neighbours), from the Australian soap opera Neighbours

See also

Mary Louise Smith (disambiguation)
Maria Smith (disambiguation)
Marie Smith (disambiguation)
Mary Smith Peake (1823–1862), American teacher and humanitarian
Mary Berenson (Mary Smith, 1864–1945), American art historian
Mary Smythe, fictional character from All My Children
List of people with surname Smith